Martin Lawrence (born 1965) is an American comedian and actor.

Martin Lawrence may also refer to:

Martin M. Lawrence (1808–1859), American photographer
Martin Lawrence, precursor to the British publishing company Lawrence & Wishart
Martin Lawrence Galleries, a chain of art galleries

See also
Lawrence Martin (disambiguation)